Anthony John McQuillan (born 19 March 1951 in Greenslopes, Queensland) is a former Australian Test cricket umpire from Queensland.

He umpired one Test match in 1993 between Australia and New Zealand at Perth on 12 November to 16 November 1993, a match drawn through Australia's "unaccountable dithering". McQuillan's partner was Darrell Hair.

McQuillan umpired 14 One Day International (ODI) matches between 1993 and 1999. Altogether, he umpired 54 first-class matches between 1989 and 2001.

Before he began umpiring, McQuillan played in the Brisbane grade cricket competition for Easts, Colts and Wynnum-Manly.

See also
 List of Test cricket umpires
 List of One Day International cricket umpires

References

External links
 
 

1951 births
Living people
Australian Test cricket umpires
Australian One Day International cricket umpires
Sportspeople from Brisbane